Megasis philippella is a species of snout moth in the genus Megasis. It was described by Pierre Viette in 1970, and is known from northern Madagascar.

Its wingspan is around 32–34 mm, length of the forewings is 17.5-18.5 mm. The forewings are dark grey with black spots, grey and brown zones. Rear wings are grey black.

The holotype was collected by P. Soga in Andilambe.

References

Moths described in 1970
Phycitini
Moths of Madagascar
Moths of Africa